Dani de Wit (born 28 January 1998) is a Dutch professional footballer who plays as a midfielder for Eredivisie club AZ.

Club career

Ajax
De Wit made his professional debut in the Eerste Divisie for Jong Ajax on 3 February 2017 in a game against RKC Waalwijk. On 25 February 2018, he made his debut in the senior squad in a 0–0 Eredivisie draw against ADO Den Haag. On 22 August 2018, he made his European debut in a 3–1 Champions League play-off win against Dynamo Kyiv.

AZ
On 30 August 2019, De Wit signed a contract with AZ Alkmaar who reportedly paid a €2 million transfer fee to Ajax.

Honours
Jong Ajax
 Eerste Divisie: 2017–18

Ajax
 Eredivisie: 2018–19
 KNVB Cup: 2018–19

Individual
UEFA European Under-21 Championship Team of the Tournament: 2021

References

External links
 

1998 births
Living people
People from Hoorn
Association football midfielders
Dutch footballers
Netherlands under-21 international footballers
Netherlands youth international footballers
AZ Alkmaar players
AFC Ajax players
Jong Ajax players
Eredivisie players
Eerste Divisie players
Footballers from North Holland